Backbone is the fifth studio album by Australian pop singer Anthony Callea. The album is produced by James Roche of Bachelor Girl and was released on 16 September 2016. It reunites Callea with Sony Music with whom he signed in 2004 and released two studio albums and two number 1 multi-platinum-selling singles. Callea said, "I'm so fortunate that Denis Handlin and Sony Music have embraced my idea of Backbone and allowed me to make this exciting album with them."

Upon announcement of the album, Callea said "With Backbone, we have explored songs that we all know and love – and we've been able to get to the core of these songs, their lyrics and melody, bringing them to the surface with organic and creative musical instrumentation and vocal delivery." He added, "I wrote the title track when I was in Los Angeles, and it sums up the essence of this album."

Reception
Myke Bartlett from The Weekly Review said, "If the choices are a tad obvious, the renditions aren’t. In stripping some songs back and slowing others down, Anthony finds something new in the well-worn."
A staff writer in Out in Perth gave the album 4 out of 5 saying, "A friendly sing-a-long with an acoustic guitar and piano. Kicking things off with Michael Jackson’s "Man in the Mirror", which is much more laid back than the original. Callea tackles Queen’s "Somebody to Love" acapella which showcases his vocal abilities. A ballad version of Bananarama’s  "Love in the First Degree" is a highlight, while a gender swap take on TLCs "Unpretty" is nice too."

Track listing
Tracks on Backbone are "stripped back" renditions of 80s and 90s tracks.

Tour
Callea promoted the album with a 5-date tour.

 September 2: Tweed Heads (Twin Towns)
 September 3: Mount Pritchard (Mounties)
 September 23: Revesby (Revesby Workers Club)
 September 24: Campbelltown (The Cube)
 September 30: Melbourne (The Palms at Crown)

Charts
Backbone debuted at number one in Australia. It was Callea's second number one album and first since his 2005 self-titled debut album.
Backbone sold 2949 in the first week, becoming the lowest selling number one debut of all time in Australia.

Personnel
 Adam Rhodes - Engineer
 Matt Neighbour - Engineer 
 Carlo Parisi - Drums
 James Richmond - Percussion
 James Roach - Piano
 Mark Amato - Piano
 Isaac Moran - Guitar
 Craig Newman - Double bass/ Electric bass
 Kellie Santin - Saxophone
 Suzanna Ling - Violin
 Ruby Paskas - Violin
 Natasha Conrau - Violin
 Katie Yap - Viola
 Charlotte Jacke - Cello / String Captain
 Susie Ahern - Backing vocals
 Annette Roche - Backing vocals
 Rocky Loprevitte - Backing vocals

Release history

See also
 List of number-one albums of 2016 (Australia)

References

2016 albums
Anthony Callea albums
Sony Music Australia albums